Ralla may refer to:

Places 
North Liverpool Extension Line (known locally as the Ralla)
Ralla, Punjab, a village in Mansa district, Punjab
Rälla, a locality in Kalmar County, Sweden